The following is a list of National Collegiate Athletic Association-sanctioned women's Division I ice hockey seasons:

 2000–01 NCAA Division I women's ice hockey season
 2001–02 NCAA Division I women's ice hockey season
 2002–03 NCAA Division I women's ice hockey season
 2003–04 NCAA Division I women's ice hockey season
 2004–05 NCAA Division I women's ice hockey season
 2005–06 NCAA Division I women's ice hockey season
 2006–07 NCAA Division I women's ice hockey season
 2007–08 NCAA Division I women's ice hockey season
 2008–09 NCAA Division I women's ice hockey season
 2009–10 NCAA Division I women's ice hockey season
 2010–11 NCAA Division I women's ice hockey season
 2011–12 NCAA Division I women's ice hockey season
 2012–13 NCAA Division I women's ice hockey season
 2013–14 NCAA Division I women's ice hockey season
 2014–15 NCAA Division I women's ice hockey season
 2015–16 NCAA Division I women's ice hockey season
 2016–17 NCAA Division I women's ice hockey season
 2017–18 NCAA Division I women's ice hockey season
 2018–19 NCAA Division I women's ice hockey season
 2019–20 NCAA Division I women's ice hockey season
 2020–21 NCAA Division I women's ice hockey season
 2021–22 NCAA Division I women's ice hockey season
 2022–23 NCAA Division I women's ice hockey season

Women's